Jason Guerriero is an American ice hockey coach and former defenseman who was an All-American for Northeastern.

Career
Guerriero was a star player in juniors, leading the NAHL in scoring in 2001 and leading the Texas Tornado to a league championship. He began attending Northeastern University the following autumn and immediately became a major piece of the team's offense. Unfortunately, during his four-year tenure, the Huskies were never a top team. For his senior season Guerriero was named team captain and was named an All-American. Once the team's season was over, Guerriero signed with the Bridgeport Sound Tigers and finished the year in the AHL.

For his first full season as a professional, Guerriero played in Finland but returned to the AHL the following year. He spent most of the next two years playing for the Milwaukee Admirals, producing modest numbers. He returned to Europe in 2008 and split time between two teams. With the second, Alba Volán Székesfehérvár, he helped the team win the Hungarian championship. The next season he tied for the scoring lead for the Schwenninger Wild Wings and led the team to a regular season championship. Guerriero played one further season in Denmark before hanging up his skates.

In 2011, Guerriero began his coaching career as an assistant for Holy Cross. After two years, he took a similar position with Yale and then joined Brown two years afterwards. He stuck with the Bears and was promoted to Associate head coach in 2019.

Career statistics

Regular season and playoffs

Awards and honors

References

External links

1981 births
Living people
AHCA Division I men's ice hockey All-Americans
American men's ice hockey defensemen
Ice hockey people from New York (state)
People from Long Island
Northeastern Huskies men's ice hockey players
Bridgeport Sound Tigers players
Ilves players
Milwaukee Admirals players
Rockford IceHogs (UHL) players
EHC Visp players
Fehérvár AV19 players
Schwenninger Wild Wings players
SønderjyskE Ishockey players